Wajjal is a village in the Shorapur taluk of Yadgir district in Karnataka state, India. Wajjal is 4 km by road east of Hunasagi. The nearest railhead is in Yadgir.

Demographics 
 census, Wajjal had 3,495 inhabitants, with 1,744 males and 1,751 females.

See also 
Shorapur (taluka headquarters)
Yadgir (district headquarters)

Notes

External links 
 

Villages in Yadgir district